InterswitchSPAK National Science Competition is a High School Science Television contest show that started  in Nigeria. It debuted in 2017 as SPAK (an acronym for Speed; Perseverance; Accuracy and Knowledge).

The 360o engagement platform is created by Oladapo Ojo and developed by JustMedia Productions for Interswitch Group.

This initiative is designed to support and encourage the study of STEM (Science, Technology, Engineering and Mathematics) across Africa.

From a national qualifying examination across the country, the best students with excellent skills get to qualify for the second stage of the Competition, emerging from a nationwide written examination. These 81 students from Nigeria and 54 from Kenya are then split into 9 groups; 9 students and 6 students respectively, to carry out the InterswitchSPAK Innovation Challenge, with the winning group receiving the Founders Award.

History 
The SPAK initiative began in 2017 as a national science competition for senior secondary schools in Nigeria. It is a Corporate Social Responsibility (CSR) project produced by JustMedia Productions. The year 2018 marked a total turn-around for the initiative as Interswitch Group became the exclusive headline sponsor of the project thereby expanding it (duration/timing) coupled with bigger and more robust rewards to the winners of the competition. In 2019, it was expanded to East Africa starting with Kenya.

The competition is designed to test the ability of each student in the sciences, with the sole objective of promoting the study of STEM subjects in Africa.

The competition is in two Phases – the Phase 1 is the iSPAK National Qualifying written Examination/test and the Phase 2 is made up of: InterswitchSPAK MasterClass, InterswitchSPAK Innovation Challenge and the main TV Show

InterswitchSPAK National Qualifying Exams 
Each of the interested schools across the nation is expected to  register their representatives (online only): their six(6) Year 11 best students in STEM subjects.

To support the girl-child initiative, each mixed school must have at least two female students – amongst the six(6) that would represent them.

Each school is to prepare their representatives for the qualifying exams in four subjects – Mathematics, Physics, Chemistry & Biology based on the current Year 11 WAEC/NECO and KCSE syllabuses as applicable.

On a pre-determined date annually in April for Nigeria and May for Kenya, we will  have all the students across both countries write an aptitude test (100 questions in 75 minutes)  to determine the best 81  or 54 students across the nation to qualify for the next stage of  the Competition. Even though the schools registered the students, the competition is strictly individual.

InterswitchSPAK MasterClass 
The InterswitchSPAK MasterClass is that part of the program designed to further develop the minds of these outstanding students.

The MasterClass exposes them to real life experiences shared by top notch speakers, thereby laying a foundation for solid careers for them.

InterswitchSPAK Innovation Challenge 
As part of the line-up of activities for the Stage II of InterswitchSPAK National Science Competition, the “InterswitchSPAK Innovation Challenge” has the students work in teams (of 9 each) on a project where they are required to proffer solutions to a societal problem in the country.

The InterswitchSPAK Innovation Challenge was introduced to inspire and motivate students to think out-of-the-box in solving problems and pushing the limits of innovation to address Africa’s many challenges.

Each of the teams was expected to analyse a problem in the society, and to present the best possible solution to this problem, leveraging on technology. Topics are allocated to each team, and with the assistance of team captains assigned to them, they were expected to work on the assigned topics, identify key challenges, proffer the best solution to the problem and present it as a team on the main TV show.

The topics over the years are given in the table below:

The winners of the InterswitchSPAK Innovation Challenge are awarded the Founder's Award with benefits, such as individual laptops, all-paid vocational jobs at Interswitch Group plus an invitation to an exclusive dinner event with top officials of the Interswitch Group and other industry leaders. In 2018, Team Neptune won the Founder's Award, and in 2019, Team Earth won the award.

InterswitchSPAK TV show 
The Main TV Show sees these 81 students drawn up into nine (9) groups based on their scores from the National Qualifying Exam. Each of the 9 groups will have students battle amongst themselves to determine the three (3) qualifiers from each group that would move into the semis. At the semifinals, the best three (3) from each of the three (3) groups would qualify for the final, and at the final (i.e. the end), the overall Best STEM student would emerge.

The InterswitchSPAK stage II is majorly focused on the following pure sciences: General Sciences, Mathematics, Physics, Chemistry, and Biology. However, a good understanding of Geography, ICT and General knowledge is an added advantage.

Various awards/educational scholarships are given to the winning students, schools, teachers and their states’ Ministries of Education.

The annual prize money for the top three students is N12.5m worth of university scholarships.

All students who make it to the TV quiz competition stage would get certificates of participation.

The table below shows previous winners of InterswitchSPAK TV Quiz since its inception in 2017, alongside the names of their schools.

InterswitchSPAK students registration (Nigeria)

References 

Nigerian game shows